Parallel-M LTD is one of the leading operators in Ukraine's oil wholesale and retail markets. The company has been operating at the Ukrainian market of petroleum products since 1995. Its network consists of 80 filling stations under TM Parallel (75 filling stations in Donetsk, Luhansk, Zaporizhia and Dnipropetrovsk Oblasts) and Gefest trade mark (4 filling stations in Kirovohrad, Zaporizhia Oblast and Crimea), and one station under TM PitStop in Donetsk.

History
The history of the company began in 1995 with the construction of gas station "Nafta" in Donetsk and purchasing the petroleum depot in Kuteynikovo village. During 1996–2003, 7 more gas stations in Donetsk and Makiivka were opened. In February 2003 a contract with Mažeikių Nafta (Lithuania) was signed for high-quality fuel supplies. Parallel and Mažeikių Nafta signed an exclusive agreement of sale of gasoline Ventus 98 and Ventus 95 in September 2003 and of fuels Ventus Diesel and Ventus 92 in 2004.

In 2005, the company introduced its loyalty program, called CarteBlanche. In 2006 the company opened its first mini-market (convenience store) under TM ZZZIP!! at the gas stations and established its own quality laboratory.  In 2007, seven more gas stations of the new format were opened in Donetsk and Makiivka. In 2007, the quality control laboratory of Parallel-M Ltd won the 4th all-Ukrainian competition of goods quality "100 Best Goods of Ukraine" in the nomination "Laboratory testing services for oil products" and the company started selling gasoline and Perfekt diesel fuel.

In 2008, five more filling stations were opened. Perfekt gasoline from "Parallel" was awarded during the final round of the all-Ukrainian contest "100 Best Goods of Ukraine". The same year Parallel became the official partner of FC Shakhtar Donetsk.

In 2009, 47 gas filling stations under TM Gefest and one station under TM PitStop passed into Parallel management. As a result of this transaction, the number of objects controlled by Parallel increased from 20 to 68, and geographical coverage expanded from one to eight regions of Ukraine, staying mainly in the eastern and central regions of the country. In 2010 the company conducted rebranding of 29 stations under TM Gefest into the Parallel network in Donetsk Oblast. Two gas stations in Donetsk were reconstructed, three new filling stations in Luhansk and one hand car wash in Makiivka were opened.

Management
The authorized capital of Parallel-M LTD is controlled by Parallel Nafta LTD, a subsidiary of System Capital Management. Yelena Khiliyenko is the CEO of Parallel-M LTD.

Business
Business of Parallel-M LTD includes: retail sale of light oil and related products, small- and large wholesale sale of petroleum products, storage and transportation of petroleum products, services, accredited laboratory for quality control of fuels and lubricants.
As of 11 October 2011 the company has in command the following assets:
 filling stations under TM Parallel – 70 
 filling stations under TM Gefest – 4
 filling station under TM PitStop – 1
 ZZZIP!! mini-markets – 70
 car hand washing stations – 3
 portal washing stations – 11
 tunnel car washes – 1
 gas fuel skids – 38
 tank farm facilities – 2
 fuel trucks – 41
 gas carriers – 6
 static petroleum testing laboratory – 1
 mobile petroleum testing laboratory – 2

References

Retail companies established in 1995
SCM Holdings
Companies based in Donetsk
Privately held companies based in Donetsk Oblast
Privately held companies in Ukraine
Economy of Donetsk Oblast
Convenience stores of Ukraine
Filling stations in Ukraine